Tony Free (born 27 June 1969) is a former Australian rules footballer who played in the VFL/AFL between 1987 and 1996 for the Richmond Football Club. He played one game in the 1987 season (wearing No. 49) and then became a regular player from 1988 (wearing No. 30).

Free's career was cut short by a knee injury and he retired in 1996. His last game was against Geelong in round 5 of 1996.

Free captained the club for three seasons from 1994 and was appointed a Director of the club in June 2008. In December 2013, he became a Life Member of the club.

In 2019 Free was inducted into the Richmond 'Hall of Fame'.

References

Publications
 Hogan P: The Tigers Of Old, Richmond FC, Melbourne 1996

External links
 

1969 births
Living people
Richmond Football Club players
Prahran Football Club players
Prahran Football Club coaches
Jack Dyer Medal winners
Australian rules footballers from Victoria (Australia)
Victorian State of Origin players